Content related to Pollution prevention may be found at, for example:

 Water pollution
 Air pollution
 Plastic pollution

Related concepts and processes
 Circular economy
 Remanufacturing
 Source reduction
 Sustainable packaging
 Toxics use reduction
 Waste minimisation

By location
 Pollution prevention in the US
 Pollution Prevention Act of 1990